Chlorostilbon is a genus of hummingbird in the family Trochilidae, known as emeralds (as are some hummingbirds in the genera Amazilia and Elvira). A single species, the blue-chinned sapphire is variously placed in the monotypic genus Chlorestes or in Chlorostilbon. The taxonomy of the C. mellisugus superspecies is highly complex and, depending on view, includes 1-8 species. All species in this genus have straight black or black-and-red bills. The males are overall iridescent green, golden-green or bluish-green, and in some species the tail and/or throat is blue. The females have whitish-grey underparts, tail-corners and post-ocular streak.

The genus Chlorostilbon was introduced in 1853 by the English ornithologist John Gould to accommodate a single species to which Gould gave the binomial name Chlorostilbon prasinus. This taxon is now considered as a subspecies of the glittering-bellied emerald Chlorostilbon lucidus pucherani.

Species
The genus contains ten species:
 Garden emerald (Chlorostilbon assimilis)
 Western emerald (Chlorostilbon melanorhynchus)
 Red-billed emerald (Chlorostilbon gibsoni)
 Blue-tailed emerald (Chlorostilbon mellisugus)
 Chiribiquete emerald (Chlorostilbon olivaresi)
 Glittering-bellied emerald (Chlorostilbon lucidus; formerly C. aureoventris)
 Coppery emerald (Chlorostilbon russatus)
 Narrow-tailed emerald (Chlorostilbon stenurus)
 Green-tailed emerald (Chlorostilbon alice)
 Short-tailed emerald (Chlorostilbon poortmani)

Gallery

References

 
Bird genera
Hummingbirds
Taxonomy articles created by Polbot